Diocese of Saratov and Volsk is an eparchy of the Russian Orthodox Church based in Saratov. The mother cathedral is the Church of the Protection of the Theotokos.

Former Bishops
Guy (Tacan): October 16, 1799 – January 10, 1808 (after December 4, 1803, see Penza diocese)
Moses (Bogdanov-Antipov-Platonov): November 29, 1828 – March 12, 1832
Jacob (Vecherkov): March 27, 1832 – January 13, 1847
Athanasius (Drozdov): January 13, 1847 – April 15, 1856
Ioanniky (Gorski): April 15, 1856 – July 17, 1860
Euthymios (Belikov): August 29, 1860 – October 17, 1863
Ioanniky (Ore): January 13, 1864 – July 13, 1873
Tikhon (Basil): July 13, 1873 – March 6, 1882
Paul (Wilczynski): April 5, 1882 – December 16, 1889
Abraham (Letnitsky): December 16, 1889 – October 24, 1893
Nicholas (Nalimov): November 13, 1893 – January 16, 1899
John (Kratirov): January 16, 1899 – March 12, 1903
Hermogenes (Dolganov): March 21, 1903 – January 17, 1912
Alexis (Dorodnitsyn): January 17, 1912 – July 30, 1914
Palladium (Dobronravov): July 30, 1914 – August 25, 1917
Dosifej (Protopopoff): August 25, 1917 – October 27, 1927
Andrew (Komarov): January 14, 1924 – March 6, 1926
Thaddeus (Uspensky): October 27, 1927 – 1928
Seraphim (Alexandrov): June 15, 1928 – August 11, 1933
Athanasius (Malinin): August 11, 1933 – September 30, 1935
Seraphim (Silichev): September 30, 1935 – 1936
Benjamin (Smith): September 23, 1936 – October 1937) 1937–1941 – Department of widow
Andrew (Komarov): December 9, 1941 – May 28, 1942  and July 13 – August 14, 1942
Gregory (Chukov): October 14, 1942 – May 26, 1944
Paisij (Samples):February 14, 1945 – January 13, 1947
Boris (Vic): January 13, 1947 – March 4, 1949
Philip (Stavitskiy): October 21, 1949 – December 12, 1952 (with the title of "Astrakhan and Saratov")
Gury (Egorov): January 28, 1953– July 1954
Benjamin (Milov): February 4, 1955 – August 2, 1955
Job (Kresovich): 1955
Benjamin (Fedchenkov): November 28, 1955 – February 20, 1958
Palladium (Sherstennikov): February 20, 1958 – May 29, 1963
Bartholomew (Gondarovsky): May 29, 1963 – December 22, 1964
Pimen (Chmielewski): January 10, 1965 – December 10, 1993
Nectarios (box): March 26, 1994 – November 19, 1994
Alexander (Timofeev): July 18, 1995 – January 7, 2003
Sergei (Poletkin): January 7, 2003 – August 19, 2003
Longin (Pavel): since August 19, 2003

Eparchies of the Russian Orthodox Church